Al Rojo Vivo is a Spanish-language expression meaning red hot. It may refer to:

Cinema
Spanish versions of the films:
White Heat (1949), directed in USA by Raoul Walsh
Mercury Rising (1998), American film directed by Harold Becker

Al rojo vivo (1969 film), 1969 Mexican film by director Gilberto Gazcón

Television
Al rojo vivo (1980 TV series), a Mexican telenovela produced by Ernesto Alonso for Televisa in 1980
Al Rojo Vivo (2002 TV program), a 2002 Spanish-language news program that airs on the American television network Telemundo
Al Rojo Vivo (2011 TV program), a 2011 daytime news and current affairs talk show aired on La Sexta in Spain

Other uses 
Al Rojo Vivo (album), a 1983 album by Ednita Nazario